David Bowers (born 1970) is an English animator, storyboard artist, film director, screenwriter and voice actor.

Early life
Bowers studied fine art at Chester School of Art and animation at West Surrey College of Art and Design. His first job was on Who Framed Roger Rabbit, as an inbetweener, under director Richard Williams.

Career
After Roger Rabbit, Bowers worked at Cosgrove Hall on the cult favourite television shows Danger Mouse and Duckula before moving to London to work for Steven Spielberg's Amblimation studio. He worked as an animator on An American Tail: Fievel Goes West, before going freelance to work on advertisements and features. Bowers later returned to Amblimation, to work on early story development, and as a supervising animator on Balto.

With the closing of Amblimation, and the founding of DreamWorks Animation, Bowers moved to Glendale, California in 1997, to work as a story artist on The Prince of Egypt and The Road to El Dorado. It was during this period that he met Aardman's Nick Park and Peter Lord, who asked him to help storyboard Aardman's first feature length film, the critically acclaimed Chicken Run. He was ultimately credited as storyboard supervisor.

After Chicken Run, Bowers moved between Los Angeles and Bristol, working on several DreamWorks and Aardman projects, including the hit 3D animated comedy Shark Tale and the Oscar winning film from Wallace and Gromit, The Curse of the Were-Rabbit, before directing Aardman's first CGI feature, Flushed Away, with Sam Fell.

He wrote/directed a Big screen CGI adaptation of Osamu Tezuka's classic Astro Boy for Imagi Animation Studios and Summit Entertainment, that was released in October 2009. Bowers directed Diary of a Wimpy Kid: Rodrick Rules, his first live action film, which was released in cinemas on 25 March 2011.

He also directed the third film in the series, Diary of a Wimpy Kid: Dog Days (2012), as well as the fourth film, Diary of a Wimpy Kid: The Long Haul (2017). Bowers was developing a live action film adaptation of the popular Nickelodeon show, Rugrats for Paramount Pictures, under the production of Paramount Players in April 2019, for a January 2021 release, before being pulled from the schedule in November 2019.

Filmography

Short films based on the film Astro Boy 

Animator
 Count Duckula (1989) (1 episode)
 An American Tail: Fievel Goes West (1991)
 FernGully: The Last Rainforest (1992)
 Danger Mouse (1992) (4 episodes)
 We're Back! A Dinosaur's Story (1993)

Storyboard artist

References

External links

 

1970 births
Living people
Aardman Animations people
British animated film directors
British storyboard artists
English animators
English film directors
DreamWorks Animation people
People from Stockport